The flag of Samoa (Samoan: fu‘a o Sāmoa) was first adopted from 24 February 1949, for UN Trusteeships, and continuously applied for the state's independence on 1 January 1962. It consists of a red field with a blue rectangle in the canton. The blue rectangle bears the Southern Cross: four large white stars and one smaller star.

The flag is officially defined by the Official Flag and National Anthem of Samoa Act 1994. When it is being raised or lowered in public people and vehicles must stop and remain stationary until the performance is complete. Those who deface the flag or who wilfully insult it can be imprisoned for up to six months.

Historical flags
Prior to the First World War, Samoa was a colony of the German Empire. German colonies used the flag of the Imperial Colonial Office, a black-white-red tricolour defaced with the Imperial Eagle. The Imperial German government intended to introduce specific flags for the colonies (also based on the tricolour) and several proposals were created, but the war and the subsequent loss of all overseas territories prevented their official adoption. New Zealand occupied German Samoa in 1914 and officially gained control of the territory in 1919.

From the capture by New Zealand forces on 29 August 1914, a defaced ensign with three palm trees encircled, and emblazoned on the fly were used. The defaced Blue Ensign was used by vessels owned by the mandate government, or those operated in the government service, while the defaced Red Ensign was used by locally registered civilian ships.

Construction Sheet

See also
Flags depicting the Southern Cross
Flag of the Republic of China
Flag of the Union of Burma (historical)

References

External links

World Statesmen – Samoa

Flags introduced in 1949
Flag
National flags
Southern Cross flags